Udea uralica is a moth in the family Crambidae. It was described by Slamka in 2013. It is found on the Asiatic slopes of the Polar Ural Mountains, the Altai Mountains and Sayan Mountains. The habitat consists of willow-grass tundra.

References

Moths described in 2013
uralica